Osbert Parsley (1510/15111585) was an English Renaissance composer and chorister. Few details of his life are known, but he evidently married in 1558, and lived for a period in the parish of St Saviour's Church, Norwich. A boy chorister at Norwich Cathedral, Parsley worked there throughout his musical career. His career spanned the reigns of Henry VIII and all three of his children. After the Reformation of 1534, the lives of English church musicians changed according to the official policy of each monarch.

Parsley wrote mainly church music for both the Latin and English rites, as well as instrumental music. His Latin settings are considered to be more fluent and attractive-sounding than those he wrote to be sung in English. His longest composition, Conserva me, domine, was in a graceful polyphonic style. Parsley's other liturgical works include Daily Offices (two morning services and an evening service), and the five-part Lamentations (notable for the difficulty in singing the top notes of the highest part). His instrumental music, nearly all for viols, including six consort pieces, was written in a style that combines both his Latin and English vocal styles. Some of his incomplete instrumental music has survived.

Parsley died in Norwich in 1585 and was buried in Norwich Cathedral. His commemorative plaque, a mark of the respect in which he was held by those who knew him, was a unique honour for a chorister at the cathedral. The plaque is inscribed with a poem praising his character and musicianship. Parsley's music is occasionally heard in church services and concerts. Compositions that have been recorded include his Lamentations and Spes Nostra.

Life and musical career

Osbert Parsley was born in 1510 or 1511; the identity of his parents and place of birth are unknown. Like many of his contemporary English composers, he began his musical career as a choirboy. During the time Parsley was a chorister, Edmund Inglott and his son William Inglott were in turn Master of the Choristers; the works written by William are found in the Fitzwilliam Virginal Book.

He became a "singing man" 1534, a post he retained for 50 years. The historian Noel Boston has conjectured that Parsley was either hired by the cathedral monks to assist them as a layman chorister, or was possibly a novice monk before his career as a monk was stopped short by the English Reformation, and he then was employed as a singing man. Parsley was first listed in Norwich Cathedral's extant accounts for 15381540, where he was named as a lay clerk, and he continued to be mentioned in the cathedral's records throughout his life. It is likely that he acted as the cathedral's unofficial organist from 1535 until his death in 1585.

In 1558 Parsley was married to one Rose and bought a house and premises in the parish of St Saviour's Church, Norwich, from John Hering and his wife, Helen. Parsley owned the house until 1583. Details of Parsley's life were first published in Henry Davey's History of English Music, first published in 1895, when he was described as a "lesser composer" from Norwich Cathedral whose works existed in manuscript form. From Parsley's will it is known that there were seven surviving children from the marriage: Henry, Edmund, John, Joan, Elizabeth, Dorothy, and Anne.

Composers during the Tudor period were honoured by being awarded an academic degree from either Oxford or Cambridge, or by becoming a member of the Chapel Royal—Parsley received neither of these highly-prized honours.

Later life (1570s and 1580s)

By the start of the 1570s, Parsley was being paid £12 a year, and the five other men in the cathedral choir were paid either £10 or £8, equivalent to the pay given to an unskilled construction worker. A decade later, the cathedral choirmaster, responsible for both the men's and boys' choirs, was being paid £12. The composer Thomas Morley, master of the choirboys from 1583, had a salary not much more than those of the singing men.

In 1578, Elizabeth I and her court came to Norwich as part of a royal progress, and the city was expected to provide accommodation, banquets and entertainment. Then the second city in England after London, Norwich was one of the few cities in the kingdom with such sufficient numbers of skilled musicians, but even so it had to resort to using viol, trumpet and cornett players from Elizabeth's entourage. Elizabeth, in the company of her courtiers, the most prominent of Norwich's citizens, and the clergy of the cathedral, heard a Te Deum by Parsley sung during the first evening of her visit, with the choir being supported by the city's waits. Parsley was paid  shillings for the songs he had written and sung during the queen's visit. His music was also performed before Elizabeth when she returned to Norwich in 1597. None of his compositions for her visits to Norwich have survived.

Death and commemoration
In 1580, Parsley's name appeared at the top of the list of lay clerks in the Norwich Cathedral audit book. His will, made on 9 December 1584, was proved by his widow on 6 April of the following year. He died in Norwich in 1585, aged 71, and was buried in the cathedral where he had worked throughout most of his life. He left bequests valued at about £75. A friend of four Bishops of Norwich—Richard Nykke, Thomas Thirlby, John Parkhurst and Edmund Freke—Parsley was also well respected by his contemporaries for his musical ability and his personal character. His fellow lay singing men honoured him by commissioning a commemorative plaque—uniquely for a lay clerk in an English cathedral—in the north aisle.

The plaque to Parsley, which once had indecipherable text, was restored in 1930 as a memorial to the composer and organist Arthur Mann. It was unveiled during an evensong service on 10 July 1930, with music by Parsley and Mann sung by the choirs of King's College, Cambridge, Ely Cathedral, and Norwich Cathedral. The text of the memorial reads:

Composing career

English composers of the late 15th century and early 16th century set a limited number of types of sacred music, each with a clear place in the liturgy.
Until the Reformation of 1534, when Henry VIII broke with the Catholic Church, English composers based their works on the Sarum rite, abolished in 1547. During the decades following the Reformation, the lives of English church musicians changed according to the policies of the reigning monarch. Henry allowed church music in England to continue to be written in a florid style, and use Latin texts, but during the reign of his son and successor, Edward VI, highly polyphonic music was no longer permitted, and the authorities destroyed church organs and music, and abolished choral foundations. These changes were never completely reverted by Edward's successor Mary during her brief reign; their half-sister Elizabeth, who succeeded Mary in 1558, confirmed or reinstated some of Edward's work.

Parsley's compositional career spanned the reigns of all four monarchs. He wrote church music for both the Latin and English rites. His Anglican church music for the Daily Office included a morning service, involving the Benedictus canticle and the Te Deum, and an evening service that involved the singing of two canticles, the Magnificat and the Nunc dimittis.

The musicologist Howard Brown noted that Parsley belonged to a group of outstanding composers from the middle period of the 16th century—William Mundy, Robert Parsons, John Sheppard, Christopher Tye, Thomas Tallis, and Robert White—who together produced a body of high quality music.

According to the scholar John Morehen, Parsley was less at ease when working with English texts, a trait Morehen finds Parsley had in common with similar Reformation composers. His Latin music is fluent and attractive, with extended phrases that become increasingly melismatic as they progress. The parts in Latin are characteristically independent in a way that was typical of sacred polyphony in England before the Reformation. The expressive psalm Conserva me, domine has an elegant polyphonic style. The technique shown in his English church music is less assured than his compositions for the Latin rite. His five-part Lamentations, which differs from settings by his contemporaries Tallis and White in that a treble line (notable for the difficulty in singing the highest notes of the part) is maintained throughout, was probably intended for domestic devotional use. During the 1920s, the musicologist and composer W. H. Grattan Flood described Parsley's Lamentations as being "of particular interest". One piece, a well-crafted three-part canonic setting of the Salvator Mundi, was printed by Morley in 1597. Morley described Parsley's arrangement of this Gregorian hymn as a model of its kind, and alluded to him as "the most learned musician".

Some of Parsley's instrumental music, nearly all for viols, survives, including six consort pieces; both his Latin and English vocal styles can be found in his instrumental style. The composition known as "Parsley's Clock" is similar to both Charles Butler's "Dial Song", and "What strikes the clocke?" by the English choirmaster and composer Edward Gibbons and a second anonymous piece, which were built around a line that counts the hours.

Peter Phillips, writing in The Musical Times, in commending Conserva me, domine, noted that "Parsley can be remembered as one of those men who just once conjured up a masterpiece, as it seems to us now, from nowhere."

Compositions

Parsley's surviving works consist mainly of church music from several locales. His choral works set to Latin texts include Conserva me, domine, his most substantial work; and the Lamentations; those set to texts in English, written after the Dissolution, are his two Morning Services, each consisting of a Benedictus canticle and a Te Deum; an Evening Service previously attributed to Tye; and the anthem "This is the Day the Lord has made". Other compositions known to have been written by Parsley include Spes nostra, a motet for five viols; five In Nomine; "O praise the Lord all ye heathen", a tenor part recently found in a prayer book; a hymn Salvator mundi domine; a Service in C major; Super septem planetarum and the work known as "Parsley's Clock". Several examples of incomplete instrumental music have also survived.

Of the four of the great Lamentations of the Tudor period for Holy Week date from the 1560s, two were composed by Tallis, and one each by William Byrd and Parsley. Earlier Lent services avoided polyphony, which was regarded as lacking in solemnity. The Oxford Dictionary of National Biography describes Parsley's Lamentations as his most famous work.

Existing manuscripts
Key
BL—British Library, London; BodL—Bodleian Library, Oxford; ERO—Essex Record Office, Chelmsford; PC—Peterhouse, Cambridge; QC—Queens' College, Cambridge; RCM—Royal College of Music; JO—Private collection of David McGhie, London; Private library of J. A. Owens, Davis, California; f.—folio, r,v—recto and verso; vv—voices.

Music for voices

Instrumental music

Complete works

Incomplete works

Recordings and performances
CD recordings of some of Parsley's compositions have been made, and his music continues to be heard in church services and concerts.

Notes

References

Sources

Further reading

External links

 
 
 Information about MS 429 – Norwich Cathedral Musical Events held by the Norfolk Record Office, Norwich, which includes detailed records of Parsley's pay.

1511 births
1585 deaths
16th-century English composers
Burials at Norwich Cathedral
Composers from Norwich
Musicians from Norwich
Norwich Cathedral
Cathedral organists
Classical composers of church music